The South Country Central School District is a district of approximately  located in southern Brookhaven Town, in Suffolk County, New York, United States.  It primarily serves the Village of Bellport and the Hamlets of North Bellport and Brookhaven. It also serves small parts of East Patchogue, Yaphank, and Medford.

Background 
The district maintains Bellport High School, Bellport Middle School, Frank P. Long School, and three primary schools, Brookhaven Elementary (which has the highest special education capability of the three), Verne W. Critz Primary School, and Kreamer Street Elementary: which happens to be on the same property as Belport middle school.. In addition, the district maintains a Pre school named the South Haven Early Childhood Center, which briefly housed the Southaven Academy, an alternative high school for challenged students. Before being repurposed as the sole preschool in the district. Since Brookhaven, which used to house a handful of pre school classes, Needed extra classes as they were facing minor overcrowding for the 2015–2016 school year. The Administrative Offices are located in East Patchogue on the campus of the Verne Critz Primary School.

The current superintendent is Antonio Santana.

References

External links
The South Country Central School District Website
New York State Comptroller's Audit Report

Education in Suffolk County, New York
School districts in New York (state)
1950s establishments in New York (state)